Fishers Peak State Park is a Colorado state park in Las Animas County, Colorado, just south of Trinidad. Trinidad Lake State Park is nearby. The park opened on October 30, 2020, and is still being developed.

History
The land for the park, formerly the privately-held Crazy French Ranch, was purchased in 2019. Funds to purchase the ranch came jointly from Great Outdoors Colorado, the funding arm of the Colorado Lottery, The Nature Conservancy, and The Trust for Public Land.

Geography
The park takes its name from Fishers Peak, elevation , a prominent, flat-topped mountain and the highest point on Raton Mesa. The mesa was designated a Natural National Landmark in 1967. The park is within the Raton Basin.

The park includes grasslands, foothills, and mountains. One of the main goals of the park's establishment is to conserve the area's wildlife, which includes elk, mule deer, black bear, mountain lions, and bobcats.

Contiguous conservation areas
Adjoining Fishers Peak State Park on the east are two Colorado State Wildlife Areas (SWA): Lake Dorothey, and James M. John, . Lake Dorothey also adjoins Sugarite Canyon State Park, in New Mexico.

References

External links
 

2020 establishments in Colorado
Protected areas of Las Animas County, Colorado
State parks of Colorado
Protected areas established in 2020